Unknown Language is the second studio album from the dancehall/reggae fusion group T.O.K., released in 2005.

Track listing 

 Hey Ladies
 Solid As A Rock
 Fire Fire
 She's Hotter (feat. Pitbull)
 Tell Me If You Still Care
 Footprints (When You Cry)
 Wah Gwaan (feat. Shaggy)
 Survivor
 Music's Pumping
 Weak
 No Way Jose
 High
 Galang Gal
 Neck Breakers
 Gal You Ah Lead
 Unknown Language
 This Is How We Roll
 Life

Singles

External links
 http://www.vprecords.com
 http://www.tokworld.com
 http://www.allreggaelyrics.com/IndexSongList.php?id=T.O.K.

2005 albums
T.O.K. albums
VP Records albums